An assegai or assagai (Arabic az-zaġāyah, Berber zaġāya "spear", Old French azagaie, Spanish azagaya, Italian zagaglia, Middle English lancegay) is a pole weapon used for throwing, usually a light spear or javelin made up of a wooden handle and an iron tip.

Area of use
The use of various types of the assegai was widespread all over Africa and it was the most common weapon used before the introduction of firearms. The Zulu, Xhosa and other Nguni tribes of South Africa were renowned for their use of the assegai.

Iklwa

Shaka of the Zulu popularized the use of the shorter stabbing spear with a two-foot (0.61 m) shaft and a larger, broader blade one foot (0.3 m) long in warfare, which was traditionally used primarily as a hunting spear. This weapon is otherwise known as the iklwa or ixwa, after the sound that was heard as it was withdrawn from the victim's wound. The traditional spear was not abandoned, but was used to range attack enemy formations before closing in for close quarters battle with the iklwa. This tactical combination originated during Shaka's military reforms. This weapon was typically used with one hand while the off hand held a cowhide shield for protection.

Botany
It is also the name of a southern African tree (Curtisia dentata) whose wood was suitable for making spears or lances, most notably by the Bantu-speaking people of southern Africa.

See also
Soliferrum
Rarabe kaPhalo
Falarica
Pilum
Battle of Amalinde
Almogavars
Shaka's military reforms
Assegai Tree, Curtisia dentata

References

External links
 

Throwing spears
Javelins
African weapons